The Okuru River is located on the West Coast of the South Island of New Zealand. It flows northwest for 45 kilometres from its headwaters in the Southern Alps to the west of the Haast Pass to the Tasman Sea at the northern end of Jackson Bay, 12 kilometres south of Haast.

The river shares its mouth with the Turnbull River. The settlement of Okuru is set on the bank of the river close to its mouth.

The Open Bay Islands lie five kilometres offshore opposite the mouth.

Westland District
Rivers of the West Coast, New Zealand
Rivers of New Zealand